Osborn Correctional Institution (OCI), formerly known as the Connecticut Correctional Institution – Somers, is a medium security state prison that includes a high security mental health unit for men of the Connecticut Department of Correction located in Somers, Connecticut. It has capacity of 1900 inmates, making it amongst the largest prisons in the state and one of the oldest operational facilities in Connecticut.

It housed the state's execution chamber until 2015, when capital punishment was declared unconstitutional. It also housed the male death row inmates until 1995 when they were transferred to the nearby Northern Correctional Institution.

History 
OCI was opened in November 1963, it served as a replacement for Old Wethersfield State Prison, it was originally the state's maximum-security prison until 1994 when it was declared into medium security prison.

Notable inmates 
 Michael Bruce Ross, convicted serial killer, was executed by lethal injection on May 13, 2005. He was the first and only person executed in Connecticut and all of New England after capital punishment was reinstated. Ross was voluntarily executed after waiving his appeals.
 Francis Clifford Smith, The oldest living and longest serving inmate in both Connecticut and U.S history, as well as the second longest serving inmate in world history.

References 

Somers, Connecticut
Buildings and structures in Tolland County, Connecticut
Prisons in Connecticut
Capital punishment in Connecticut
Execution sites in the United States
1963 establishments in Connecticut